The 1932–33 Serie B was the fourth tournament of this football competition played in Italy since its creation.

Teams
Grion Pola, Messina and Sampierdarenese had been promoted from Prima Divisione, while Brescia and Modena had been relegated from Serie A.

Final classification

Results

1932-1933
2
Italy